Barbexaclone (Maliasin) is a salt compound of phenobarbital and levopropylhexedrine. It was introduced in 1983. It has been reported to be as effective as phenobarbital but better tolerated; however, as of 2004, these "promising results" had not yet been confirmed nor denied in controlled trials.

Potency
100 mg of barbexaclone is equivalent to 60 mg of phenobarbital.

References

Further reading 

 

Barbiturates
Combination drugs
GABAA receptor positive allosteric modulators
Norepinephrine-dopamine releasing agents
Stimulants
Sedatives
Abandoned drugs